Antanas Sutkus (born 27 June 1939) is a Lithuanian photographer.

Sutkus is a recipient of the Lithuanian National Prize for Culture and Arts, the Order of the Lithuanian Grand Duke Gediminas, and the Dr. Erich Salomon Award. He was one of the co-founders and a president of the Lithuanian Association of Art Photographers.

Life and work
Sutkus was born on 27 June 1939 in Kluoniškiai, Kaunas district, Lithuania.

He studied journalism at Vilnius University in the late 1950s; at the time the Lithuanian SSR was part of the Soviet Union.  He became disillusioned by the confines of the Soviet-controlled press and began taking photographs, wanting to find a way to make his camera "a weapon for the underground" in portraying resistance to the USSR. Sutkus concentrated on black and white portraits of ordinary people in their everyday life rather than the model citizens and workers promoted by Soviet propaganda. He photographed children, who represented a kind of freedom: "Children have a world with its own laws, rules, its own happiness and sadness. To enter it, you need to feel that you are a kid. Adults and children are different stories." A series of mid-1960s portraits of children, often with  adults in the shot pointedly faceless and irrelevant, was collected in a 2020 book. He took a photograph that became famous of a communist "Young Pioneer" boy with shaven head and very sad expression which got him called before the central committee and denounced as "photography's Solzhenitsyn" (see illustration of poster above).

He co-founded the Lithuanian Association of Art Photographers in 1969. He is well-known for his life-long survey, People of Lithuania, begun in 1976 to document the changing life and people of the Lithuanian SSR.

Sutkus had an opportunity to spend time with Jean-Paul Sartre and Simone de Beauvoir in 1965 when they visited Lithuania. One image, taken against the white sand of Nida, is highly regarded as capturing Sartre's ideas.

Publications
Neringa. Vilnius: Mintis, 1982. . Text in English, German, Lithuanian, and Russian.
Lietuva = Lithuaniua. Vilnius: Lietuvos Fotomeninink Sąjungos Fondas, 1992. . Edited and with a text by Alfred Bumblauskas.
Antanas Sutkus: Fotografijos: 1959-1999 = Antanas Sutkus: Photographs: 1959-1999. Vilnius: Baltos lankos, 2000. .
Retrospektyva = Retrospective. Vilnius: Sapna Sala, 2009. .
Lithuanian Portraits. With a text by Nadim Julien Samman. Accompanied an exhibition at White Space Gallery, London, and Signs of Time Gallery, Moscow.
People of Lithuania. Kaunas, Lithuania: Kaunas Photography Gallery; Lithuanian Photographer's Association, 2015. . With a preface by William A. Ewing and an essay by Margarita Matulytė. Edited by Gintaras Česonis in cooperation with Ewing, Jean-Marc Lacabe and Margarita Matulytė.
In Memoriam. London: White Space Gallery, 2016. With a text by Alfonsas Bukontas.

Awards
1997: Order of the Lithuanian Grand Duke Gediminas.
2003: Lithuanian National Prize for Culture and Arts
2017: Dr. Erich Salomon Award

Exhibitions
Un Regard Libre, Le château d’eau, pôle photographique de Toulouse, Toulouse, France, March–April 2011.
Nostalgia for Bare Feet, The Lumiere Brothers Center for Photography, Moscow, April–May 2016.

References

External links

Sutkus profile at White Space Gallery

1939 births
Living people
People from Kaunas District Municipality
Vilnius University alumni
Lithuanian photographers
Recipients of the Lithuanian National Prize
Recipients of the Order of the Lithuanian Grand Duke Gediminas